Gerald Stokell (20 June 1890 – 10 July 1972) was a New Zealand amateur ichthyologist.

Early life
Stokell was born at Prebbleton, near Christchurch, New Zealand, on 20 June 1890 to Edmund Stokell and Jane (Née Pasche). He lived there for his whole life.  He attended Broadfields Primary School, and was a keen trout angler.

Interest in freshwater fish
A keen angler, Stokell wrote a series of studies on trout in Lake Ellismere. Through this interest in angling, he also came across native fish species, but was unable to identify them due to a lack of published information. From 1938 onwards he began publishing papers on them, describing species and detangling the many names that had accrued. He described 10 species that are still accepted, although others turned out to be junior synonyms.

Species described
 Galaxias paucispondylus (1938) alpine galaxias
 Gobiomorphus breviceps (1939) upland bully
 Galaxias prognathus (1940) longjaw galaxias
 Neochanna diversus (1949) Black mudfish
 Galaxias vulgaris (1949) Canterbury galaxias
 Galaxias anomalus (1959) Central Otago roundhead galaxias
 Gobiomorphus hubbsi (1959) bluegill bully
 Galaxias divergens (1959) dwarf galaxias
 Gobiomorphus alpinus (1962) Tarndale bully

In 1941 Stokell's smelt, Stokellia anisodon, was named after him.

Memberships
 Council of the North Canterbury Acclimatisation Society 
 Staff of the Canterbury Museum 
 Secretary of the Canterbury branch of the Royal Society of New Zealand

A direct man with forceful opinions, he left the Acclimatisation Society, stating:Their sole qualification for safe-guarding the welfare of wild creatures [is] the possession of a desire to kill them.

Death
Stokell died 10 July 1972 in Christchurch.

Works
 Freshwater fishes of New Zealand, 1955
 Freshwater and diadromous fishes of New Zealand, 1972

See also
:Category:Taxa named by Gerald Stokell

References

Notes

Bibliography
 

1890 births
1972 deaths
New Zealand ichthyologists
20th-century New Zealand zoologists